Tularampur Union is an Union parishad of Narail Sadar Upazila, Narail District in Khulna Division of Bangladesh. It has an area of 48.48 km2 (18.72 sq mi) and a population of 16,510.

References

Unions of Narail Sadar Upazila
Unions of Narail District
Unions of Khulna Division